USA Network Sports, may refer to:

 USA Sports, the former sports department of USA Network
 NBC Sports on USA Network, the branding used for NBC Sports airing on USA Network